Vladimir "Vlatko" Marković (1 January 1937 – 23 September 2013) was a Croatian professional football manager and player who served as the president of the Croatian Football Federation from 1998 to 2012.

Playing career

Club
He played for: Iskra (Bugojno), Čelik (Zenica), Dinamo (Zagreb), Wiener SC (Vienna).

International
From 1958 until 1959 he played three matches for Yugoslavia national under-21 football team, and from 7 May 1961 (debut against Hungary) until 30 September 1962 (final game against West Germany) he played in defense for Yugoslavia and scored one own goal in 16 matches. He played in all matches on 1962 FIFA World Cup when Yugoslavia finished 4th.

Managerial career
After he finished his playing career, he coached Zagreb (Zagreb), Standard de Liège (Liège), OGC Nice (Nice), Hajduk (Split) and Dinamo (Zagreb). With Dinamo he won Yugoslav Cup in 1980.

From 1974 to 1978 he was a FIFA instructor. He also participated in the FIFA Coca-Cola-program.

He was elected president of the Croatian Football Federation on 18 December 1998. He was reelected in 2002 and on 16 December 2006, again with unanimous support. He resigned at 15 May 2012.

Personal life
In 1945, his uncles died during the Yugoslav death march of Nazi collaborators. In SFRY, his father spent over 15 years in prison for possessing illegal firearm.

Views
In November 2010, Marković spoke out against gay footballers, telling both the Croatian Večernji list and the Serbian Večernje novosti that, "As long as I'm president [of the Croatian football federation] there will be no gay players. Thank goodness only healthy people play football." He has been reported for the comment to UEFA. In July 2011, in response to his comments, he was charged €10,000 by UEFA.

Death
He died at Zagreb in 2013. He was 76.

Managerial statistics
Source:

Honours
Source:

Player
Dinamo Zagreb
Yugoslav Cup: 1960, 1963

Manager
Yugoslavia U-23
Under-23 Challenge Cup: 1969
Balkan Youth Championship: 1972

NK Zagreb
Yugoslav Second League: 1972–73

Dinamo Zagreb
Yugoslav Cup: 1980

Individual
Matija Ljubek Award: 2002
HNS's Trophy Trophies: 2003
Franjo Bučar State Award for Sport: 2008
UEFA Amicale des Anciens: 2009
Holder of title Dragon of silver Bosnia in Brethren of the Croatian Dragon

References

External links

Leksikografski zavod Miroslav Krleža Nogometni leksikon

1937 births
2013 deaths
People from Bugojno
Croats of Bosnia and Herzegovina
Bosnia and Herzegovina emigrants to Croatia
Association football defenders
Yugoslav footballers
Yugoslavia under-21 international footballers
Yugoslavia international footballers
1962 FIFA World Cup players
NK Iskra Bugojno players
NK Čelik Zenica players
GNK Dinamo Zagreb players
K.A.A. Gent players
Wiener Sport-Club players
FK Austria Wien players
Yugoslav First League players
Belgian Pro League players
Austrian Football Bundesliga players
Yugoslav expatriate footballers
Expatriate footballers in Belgium
Yugoslav expatriate sportspeople in Belgium
Expatriate footballers in Austria
Yugoslav expatriate sportspeople in Austria
Yugoslav football managers
Croatian football managers
Bosnia and Herzegovina football managers
NK Zagreb managers
Standard Liège managers
OGC Nice managers
HNK Hajduk Split managers
GNK Dinamo Zagreb managers
SK Rapid Wien managers
Croatia national football team managers
Yugoslav expatriate football managers
Expatriate football managers in Belgium
Expatriate football managers in Austria
Presidents of the Croatian Football Federation